My Guardian Debil is a 1998 Philippine comedy film written and directed by Jun Urbano. The film stars Jimmy Santos as the title role.

Cast
 Jimmy Santos as Dimawari
 Ronnie Ricketts as Nato
 Chin Chin Gutierrez as Sabel
 Earl Ignacio as Lalaw
 Junix Inocian as Tartaro
 Tonton Gutierrez as Raul
 Lucita Soriano as Aling Mila
 Renato del Prado as Mang Pete
 Matutina as Dalay
 Lester Llansang as Boyet
 Noel Trinidad as Mr. Dom
 Koko Trinidad as Eskribong Anghel
 Ruby Solmerano as Kapitana
 Maning Rivera as Preacher
 Joanne Salazar as Angel
 Kim Hartwig as Angel
 Olivia Wiazan as Angel
 Bernadete Ang as Angel
 Philip Supnet as Another Man

Reception
Isah Red of the Manila Standard gave My Guardian Debil a mixed review, calling it a decent film. He praised Jimmy Santos for giving his "character just the right amount of comic touches to make him pathetically funny" and his departure from his carabao English acts. However, he criticizes the film for its lack of comic tension, stating that "the gags seem more serious than funny".

References

External links

1998 films
GMA Pictures films
Filipino-language films
Philippine comedy films